The 1971 Space City 300 was a NASCAR Winston Cup Series racing event that took place on June 23, 1971, at Meyer Speedway in Houston, Texas. While Houston was considered to be one of the epicenters of stock car racing during the 1950s and 1960s, the local passion for the motorsport died out starting in the 1970s.

Meyer Speedway was bumpy enough to loosen bolts off of a typical NASCAR vehicle.

While NASCAR's top series had a successful 48 race schedule in previous years, by 1971 the reduced sponsorship money being given out by the "Big Three" automobile companies made it difficult for race car drivers to justify driving their "stock" race cars under their own power (as required by the homologation rules until 1975) to events offering only small prize money.

Race report
Bobby Allison defeated James Hylton by at least two laps after two hours and two minutes of racing 300 laps on a paved track); marking Allison's fifth consecutive win. There were no cautions given out by NASCAR; making this a perfect race alongside the 1959 Daytona 500, the 1969 Motor Trend 500, the 1971 Asheville 300 and the 2002 EA Sports 500; which became the final oval course race that had gone the entire distance without a single caution flag.

Pete Arnold would make his only start here and record the race's last-place finish due to a steering issue on lap 58. Fred Hill would make his only NASCAR Cup Series start here; ending his day with a rear end issue on lap 116. Walter Ballard finished third to claim his best career NASCAR finish. Richard Petty qualified in second place and managed to dominate 38 laps before the halfway point. Petty's vehicle developed problems with its distributor. More than 10 minutes were lost and 28 laps went by in the race before Petty was able to get his vehicle back on the track. Miraculously, he gained back 7 of his lost laps and salvaged a top-10 finish.

The NASCAR Cup Series has never again come close to having a field this small. Even for the rest of 1971, they only once had fewer than 29 cars and that was a 22 car field. Hill and Arnold make their only cup starts in this debacle of a NASCAR Cup Series event. Ronnie Chumley, who lasted a bit longer, only started six other career Cup races. The motivation to stop here on the way back across the country from Riverside was not strong as most drivers did not put their best effort forward.

This would be the last race until Kaz Grala's 2020 run at Daytona for Austin Dillon that a Cup driver debuted in a #3.

Frank Warren's Pontiac was the only General Motors product on the racing grid. The next NASCAR Winston Cup Series race to lack a major manufacturer would be the 1982 Daytona 500; which excluded all Chevrolet vehicles. Lee Gordon, Vic Ballard and Dale Inman were the three notable crew chiefs that participated in the event.

Only manual transmission vehicles were allowed to participate in this race, a policy that NASCAR has retained to the present day (as of 2022). This event would become Meyer Speedway's only NASCAR Cup Series racing event. There would be less than 15 cars in the entire racing event; a rarity during the early 1970s. 

The winner would receive $2,200 in winnings ($ when adjusted for inflation) while the last-place finisher would walk away with $340 ($ when adjusted for inflation). Most of the teams that raced at Meyer Speedway went straight back to the Southeastern United States due to the meager prize money that was handed out at this racing event staged in the Southwestern United States.

Qualifying

Finishing order

Timeline
Section reference: 
 Lap 5: Bobby Allison takes over the lead from Richard Petty.
 Lap 9: Richard Petty takes over the lead from Bobby Allison.
 Lap 43: Bobby Allison takes over the lead from Richard Petty.
 Lap 58: Pete Arnold had trouble steering his vehicle, forcing him to withdraw from the event.
 Lap 116: Fred Hill would suffer severe damage to his vehicle's rear end, ending his day at the event.
 Lap 136: Ronnie Chumley's transmission would stop working in a normal fashion, causing him to withdraw from the event.
 Lap 148: James Hylton takes over the lead from Bobby Allison.
 Lap 157: Bobby Allison takes over the lead from James Hylton.
 Finish: Bobby Allison was officially declared the winner of the event.

References

Space City 300
Space City 300
NASCAR races at Meyer Speedway